Nalinaksha is a given name. Notable people with the name include:

 Nalinaksha Dutt (1894–1973), Indian politician
 Nalinaksha Roy (1902–1951), 49th Raja of the Chakma Circle
 Nalinaksha Sanyal (1898–1987), Indian politician, economist, and freedom fighter

Indian given names